The ACM Eugene L. Lawler Award is awarded every two or three years by the Association for Computing Machinery to an individual or a group of individuals who have made a significant contribution to the use of information technology for humanitarian purposes in a wide range of social domains. It is named after the computer scientist Eugene Lawler. The award includes a financial reward of US$5,000.

Recipients

See also

 List of computer science awards

References 

Association for Computing Machinery
Computer science awards